Airat Kadeikin (born July 7, 1970) is a Soviet and Russian former professional ice hockey forward. He is a one-time Russian Champion.

Awards and honors

References

External links
Biographical information and career statistics from Eliteprospects.com, or The Internet Hockey Database

1970 births
Living people
Dizel Penza players
HC Sibir Novosibirsk players
Ak Bars Kazan players
HC Neftekhimik Nizhnekamsk players
Metallurg Novokuznetsk players
Neftyanik Almetyevsk players
Russian ice hockey forwards